Covenant Christian School is a private Christian school located in Panama City, Florida. The school educates students in Pre-K (age 3) to 12th grade. The school is a ministry of Covenant Presbyterian Church of Panama City. It was founded in 1982 and had its first graduating class in 1989. The current school headmaster is Michael Sabo.

Education

Curriculum
The school started using the Classical Curriculum at the start of the school year in 2009, as the only school in the Bay County Area to do so. The school is divided into the Beginning Grammar, Grammar, Logic, and Rhetoric classes instead of the usual pre-K, elementary, middle, and high school classes. Covenant's main language course is Latin, so many of the phrases found in school clothing and marketing are in Latin.

High school
Starting with the school year in 2013, Covenant Christian School is the only private high school in Bay County that offers non-virtual high school. Students have the option to customize their schedule to take classes at the school, online, or dual-enroll at Gulf Coast State College.

Facility
The campus of Covenant Christian School includes 24 classrooms, 1 media center, 1 art studio, 1 science lab, 1 gymnasium, 3 outdoor playgrounds, 1 practice soccer field, 1 sanctuary, 1 fellowship hall, 2 robotics rooms, 3 lunch grounds, 2 basketball courts, and 5 bathroom locations.

Gymnasium
Dubbed The Lions Den by students and faculty of Covenant Christian School, their gymnasium features 4 built-in basketball goals, 4 movable ones, and hosts all of the schools home basketball and volleyball games. A center platform is present on the opposite side of the entrance for scorekeepers, performers, and MCs. and two rooms (one classroom and one Martial Arts room) are built upstairs of the gym.

Extracurricular activities
Covenant Christian School offers a wide variety of extracurricular activities, ranging from robotics to martial arts. Below is a list of a few extracurricular activities:

 Robotics Club (With the FLL)
 Strategy Club
 Extreme Sports (Soccer, Basketball, Flag Football)
 Before and After care
 Gymnastics
 Piano, Voice
 Yearbook
 Jr Beta Club

Robotics club
Covenant has a prestigious robotics club in the FLL, with teams that have advanced to the state competition all the years that they have competed. Due to the size of the club, Covenant competes with four teams: The Knights, The Vikings, The Crusaders, and the Spartans. Many regional competitions are hosted at the school, with students coming from all over the Florida Panhandle to compete.

Sports
Covenant is a participant in the Bay County Private Schools' "Extreme Sports" Program. where kids from 1st through 5th grade participate in basketball, soccer, and flag football. High school students participate in the FHSAA sports league as a member of a public school team.

References

External links
 Covenant Christian School website
 Covenant Christian School 2007-2008 Student Handbook (PDF)
 https://m.facebook.com/covenantpc/

Christian schools in Florida
Educational institutions established in 1982
High schools in Bay County, Florida
Private high schools in Florida
Private middle schools in Florida
Private elementary schools in Florida
1982 establishments in Florida